The 2019 Aphrodite Women Cup was the 4th edition of Aphrodite Women Cup, a friendly association football tournament played in Cyprus.

Teams

Group stage

Goalscorers

References

February 2019 sports events in Europe
2019 in Cypriot sport
2019
Aphrodite Women Cup
Aphrodite Women Cup